A list of orders, deliveries, and current and previous operators of the Airbus A310 .

References

operators
Airbus A310

el:Χρήστες του Airbus A310